The North Tippah School District is a public school district based in the community of Tiplersville, Mississippi (USA).

In addition to Tiplersville, the district serves the towns of Walnut and Falkner, the unincorporated community of Chalybeate as well as rural areas in northern Tippah County.

Schools
Falkner High School
Falkner Elementary School
Chalybeate Elementary School
Walnut Attendance Center

Demographics

2006-07 school year

There were a total of 1,385 students enrolled in the North Tippah School District during the 2006–2007 school year. The gender makeup of the district was 49% female and 51% male. The racial makeup of the district was 11.12% African American, 86.71% White, 1.73% Hispanic, 0.29% Native American, and 0.14% Asian. 51.7% of the district's students were eligible to receive free lunch.

Previous school years

Accountability statistics

See also
List of school districts in Mississippi

References

External links
 

Education in Tippah County, Mississippi
School districts in Mississippi